State Road 127 (NM 127) is a  state highway in the US state of New Mexico. NM 127's eastern terminus is at U.S. Route 64 (US 64) in Eagle Nest, and the western terminus is at the end of state maintenance near Idlewild.

Major intersections

See also

References

127
Transportation in Colfax County, New Mexico